Fighting Instinct was the debut album of the band Fighting Instinct, released on June 27, 2006. The self-titled album consists of 10 tracks. The album's lead single, "I Found Forever", rose to No. 31 on the active rock charts with virtually no touring. Another single, "Back to You", reached No. 5 on the Christian CHR charts. "Back to You" was also featured on a Gotee Records compilations named "Gotee Hits". An acoustic version of "Back to You" was recorded for another Gotee Records compilation, called "Gotee Acoustic". "Just to Please You" was featured on another Gotee Records compilation named "Gotee Worship".

Critical reception 

Christa A. Banister, grading the album an A− for CCM Magazine, writes, "While the formula that Fighting Instinct has come up with isn’t exactly new, the songs are so well-conceived that you don’t care."

Track listing

Singles 

 "I Found Forever"
 "Back to You"
 "Just to Please You"

Personnel 
 TJ Harris – vocals, guitars
 Jason Weekly – bass guitar
 Dallas Farmer – drums

References

2006 debut albums
Gotee Records albums
Fighting Instinct albums